Arts and Humanities in Higher Education is a quarterly peer-reviewed academic journal that covers the field of education of the arts and humanities. The editor-in-chief is Jan McArthur (Lancaster University). It was established in 2002 and is currently published by SAGE Publications.

Abstracting and indexing 
The journal is abstracted and indexed in the following databases:
 British Humanities Index
 Contents Pages in Education
 MLA International Bibliography
 Scopus
 Zetoc

References

External links 
 

SAGE Publishing academic journals
English-language journals
Education journals
Publications established in 2002
Quarterly journals